The 1984 British Aerospace 1000 was the fifth round of the 1984 World Endurance Championship. Points were however only awarded in the Drivers Championship, leading to several teams opting to not participate. It took place at Brands Hatch, Great Britain on 29 July 1984.

Official results
Class winners in bold. Cars failing to complete 75% of the winner's distance marked as Not Classified (NC).

† - The #94 Gild Bard Techspeed Racing Grid-Ford was disqualified after the race for being pushed across the finish line on the final lap of the race.

‡ - The #84 Lyncar Motorsports Ltd. Lyncar-Ford was disqualified after the race for taking too long to complete the final lap of the race.

Statistics 
 Pole Position - #14 GTi Engineering - 1:17.32
 Fastest Lap - #14 GTi Engineering and #4 Martini Racing - 1:21.03
 Average Speed -

References 

 
 

Brands Hatch
Brands Hatch